King's Department Stores was a chain of discount stores in the Eastern United States.  The chain started in 1956, in Brockton, Massachusetts.  They expanded to 187 stores (three stores operated in the Buffalo, New York area). In 1978, they purchased the bankrupt Mammoth Mart chain. Because of the economic downturn and the debt from the Mammoth purchase, they filed for Chapter 11 bankruptcy in 1982.  In 1984 Ames Department Stores purchased the chain and converted most of them into Ames stores.  Ames went out of business in 2002.

Retail Chains Bought out By King's

Mammoth Mart

Barker's Discount Department Stores

 Sandy's Discount Stores
 Miracle Mart (US Chain, not to be confused with the Canadian chain)

References

Defunct discount stores of the United States
Defunct companies based in Massachusetts
1956 establishments in Massachusetts